XCF, short for eXperimental Computing Facility, is the native image format of the GIMP image-editing program. It saves all of the data the program handles related to the image, including, among others, each layer, the current selection, channels, transparency, paths and guides.

Prior to version 4 (GIMP 2.10.0, released on 2018-04-27), the saved image data are compressed only by a simple RLE algorithm, but GIMP supports compressed files, using gzip, bzip2, or xz. The compressed files can be opened as normal image files. Since version 4, the image data can be compressed by zlib instead.

The XCF file format is backward compatible (all versions of GIMP can open earlier versions' files) and in some cases, forward compatible. For example, GIMP 2.0 can save text in text layers while GIMP 1.2 cannot. Text layers saved in GIMP 2.0 will open as ordinary image layers in GIMP 1.2. However, XCF files containing layer groups, a feature introduced in GIMP 2.7, cannot be opened with GIMP 2.6.

Despite some use in other programs (see §software support), the use of XCF as a data interchange format is not recommended by the developers of GIMP,

since the format reflects GIMP's internal data structures and there may be minor format changes in future versions. Instead, a collaborative effort between the developers of GIMP and Krita is underway to design a standardised raster file format called OpenRaster (modelled on the OpenDocument format) for future use in both applications, and likely in others also.

GIMP's Save dialog saves in the XCF format: starting with version 2.8, other formats with import/export support were moved to an Export dialog.

Software support 

A partial list of image viewers and conversion software.

References

External links 

 Documentation of the XCF File Format

Graphics file formats